Olton Willem van Genderen (17 October 1921 – 9 November 1990) was a Surinamese civil servant and politician. He served as Deputy Prime Minister of Suriname from 24 December 1973 until the coup d'état of 25 February 1980. He was one of the main negotiators for the Independence of Suriname.

Biography
Van Genderen was born on 17 October 1921 in Albina. He worked for the customs agency. In 1950s, he went to Rotterdam for four years, and became a licensed customs officer.

Van Genderen became active in the trade union and politics. He was given the honorary title Da Djendé (Ndyuka: Beautiful teacher). In 1958, he was first elected to the Estates of Suriname, and was re-elected five times. On 16 May 1967, he was elected Chairman of the Estates of Suriname, and served until 1 September 1969.

On 15 December 1973, he was re-elected as Chairman, however he resigned on 28 December, because on 24 December, he had been elected as Deputy Prime Minister of Suriname in the Arron cabinet. He also served as Minister of District Administration and Decentralisation.

The Arron government was in dialogue with the Dutch government about the Independence of Suriname, and van Genderen became one of the main negotiators. On 25 November 1975, Suriname became an independent country. In 1977, he was appointed Minister of the Interior which was the successor of Ministry of District Administration and Decentralisation.

On 25 February 1980, Desi Bouterse committed a coup d'état. Arron went into hiding, however van Genderen was captured. On 26 February, van Genderen and Minister Badrising announced the surrender of the government on television, and asked the population not to resist the military regime. On 28 February, Arron surrendered to the regime. Van Genderen was placed under house arrest until February 1981. On 19 June 1981, van Genderen was sentenced to four months imprisonment minus time served under house arrest, and a total fine of ƒ 55,000.

Van Genderen died on 9 November 1990, at the age of 69.

Honours and legacy
 : Commander in the Honorary Order of the Yellow Star.
 : Officer in the Order of Orange-Nassau (1967).
 : Knight in the Order of Francisco de Miranda.

In 2021, the Emmastraat in Albina was renamed Olton Willem van Genderen Boulevard in his honour.

References

External links
 
 Olton Willem van Genderen Foundation 

1921 births
1990 deaths
People from Marowijne District
National Party of Suriname politicians
Government ministers of Suriname
Chairmen of the Estates of Suriname
Surinamese politicians
Officers of the Order of Orange-Nassau
Honorary Order of the Yellow Star